The following is a list of compositions by Leo Sowerby.

Choral

Cantatas
A Liturgy of Hope (selections from the Psalms) (1917)
The Vision of Sir Launfal (poem of James Russell Lowell (1925)
Forsaken of Man (Passion setting, adapted from the Gospels by Edward Borgers) (1939)
The Canticle of the Sun (St Francis of Assisi) (1944), mentioned above
The Throne of God (Book of Revelation) (1956)

Anthems
"Ad te levavi animam meam"
"Behold, O God our Defender"
"Christians, to the Paschal Victim"
"Come, Holy Ghost, our souls inspire"
"I was glad when they said unto me"
"I will lift up mine eyes"
"Love came down at Christmas"
"Thy Word is a lantern" (in memory of President John F. Kennedy)

Organ

Solo 
Carillon (1917)
Symphony in G (1930)
Pageant (1931)
Prelude on "The King's Majesty" (1945)
Canon, Chacony, & Fugue (1948)
Ten Preludes on Hymn Tunes (1950s, published by H.W. Gray in 1956, includes Deus tuorum militum, Sine nomine, St. Dunstan's, Capel, Song 46, St. Patrick, Were you there?, Land of rest, Charterhouse, and Ad perennis vitae fontem)
Sinfonia Brevis (1965)
Passacaglia (1967)

With other instruments 
Organ concerto (1938)
Toccata on 'A.G.O.''' for organ, brass and timpaniFestival Musick for organ, brass and timpaniClassic concerto for organ and orchestra (1944)Mediæval Poem for organ, vocalist and orchestraConcertpiece for organ and orchestra, (1951)

 Orchestra & other instruments 
Violin concerto, premiered 1913, revised 1924A Set of Four: A Suite of Ironics, published in 1931
Five symphonies
Concert overture for orchestra
Harp concertoPassacaglia'' (1964) for carillon

Chamber music 
violin sonatas in A major, B-flat major and D major
cello sonata
viola sonata (playable on clarinet or viola)
piano trio in C-sharp minor
serenade for string quartet in G major published 1921
wind quintet published in 1931
piano sonata
passacaglia for piano

References

Sowerby, Leo, compositions by